The MPL-50 (malaya pekhotnaya lopata-50, small infantry spade-50) is a small spade ( length) invented by Danish officer Mads Johan Buch Linnemann in 1869. It has been used by rank and file military personnel in the Russian Empire, Soviet Union and its successor states since the late 19th century. While nominally an entrenching tool, the MPL-50 has seen wide-ranging wartime applications, from a close-quarters combat weapon to a cooking utensil.

History
The MPL-50 was invented in 1869 by the Danish officer Mads Johan Buch Linnemann. In 1870 it was patented and supplied to the Danish Army. The next year it was adopted by the much bigger Austrian Army, and Linnemann founded a factory in Vienna to produce his spade. It was later introduced to Germany, France, Romania and Russia, though only Russia recognized Linnemann's patent rights, and paid him 30,000 rubles and ordered 60,000 spades. The MPL-50 remains almost unchanged through its history in Russia and the Soviet Union; attempts to introduce a folded-handle design were not approved.

Design
It is sharpened on its working edge and often on one side, for use as an axe. The wooden handle is not painted, but polished with sandpaper and fire singed to create a smooth surface that does not slide in the hand. The blade carries the manufacturer's seal, which indicates the production year and distinguishes original products from forgeries.

Use
The main purpose of MPL-50 is entrenching, which is carried out at a rate of 0.1–0.5 m3/hour depending on the soil type and physical condition of the soldier. The spade can also be used as an axe, and one side of its blade is sharpened for this purpose, or as a hammer, with the flat of the blade as the working surface. It can serve as an oar for paddling on improvised rafts, as a frying pan for cooking food, and as a measuring device, as its length and width are standardized. 

Soviet Spetsnaz units had advanced training with the MPL-50, which they mostly used as a weapon for close quarters combat rather than for entrenching. The spade is well balanced, which allows it to be used as a throwing weapon.

In March 2023, the UK's Ministry of Defence reported that Russian military reservists fighting in Ukraine had resorted to using MPL-50s in hand-to-hand combat, due to an increase in close combat due to a shortage of artillery ammunition. Despite some sensational headlines, the troops were equipped with firearms.

References

Military equipment of Russia
Shovels